Sphingobacterium chuzhouense is a Gram-negative, aerobic, rod-shaped, non-spore-forming and non-motile bacterium from the genus of Sphingobacterium which has been isolated from farmland soil from Chuzhouin China.

References

External links
Type strain of Sphingobacterium chuzhouense at BacDive -  the Bacterial Diversity Metadatabase

 

Sphingobacteriia
Bacteria described in 2016